The 2015 Valparaiso Crusaders football team represented Valparaiso University in the 2015 NCAA Division I FCS football season. They were led by second-year head coach Dave Cecchini and played their home games at Brown Field. They were a member of the Pioneer Football League. They finished the season 1–9, 1–7 in PFL play to finish in a three way tie for eighth place.

Schedule

± College of Faith didn't meet NCAA accreditation guidelines and all stats and records from this game do not count.

References

Valparaiso
Valparaiso Beacons football seasons
Valparaiso Crusaders football